Urban Blues is the fourth recording by John Lee Hooker under the ABC recording years. It was released in 1967 under the ABC-Bluesway record label, and re-released in 1993 under MCA records with two bonus tracks and a different song order.

Track listing

Personnel 
 John Lee Hooker – guitar, vocals
 Eddie Taylor – guitar
 Phil Upchurch – bass guitar
 Al Duncan – drums
Technical
 Al Smith – audio production
 Margaret Glogowski – cover design
 Henry Epstein – cover design
 Sheldon Harris – liner notes
 Mel Cheren – cover painting

References 

1967 albums
John Lee Hooker albums
BluesWay Records albums